Paula Froelich is an American journalist and author of the book Mercury in Retrograde, which appeared on the New York Times Best Seller list.

Froelich was a columnist for the New York Post Page Six. Between March 31, 2014, and October 2015, she was editor in chief of Yahoo Travel, where she led editorial direction, original content, and the expansion and re-imagination of the site. She is the founder of the website A Broad Abroad. She is also working on a novel for young adults.

She was born in Leeds, England in 1973 and grew up in Cincinnati, Ohio. Her mother is Jewish.

References

External links
https://web.archive.org/web/20110716073519/http://authors.simonandschuster.com/Paula-Froelich/48546526/biography
http://paulafroelich.com/

Living people
American women novelists
American columnists
American women columnists
New York Post people
Yahoo! people
21st-century American novelists
21st-century American women writers
1973 births
Novelists from New York (state)
21st-century American non-fiction writers